The Darran Mountains are a prominent range within New Zealand's Fiordland National Park, the country's biggest national park. They contain the park's highest peak, Mount Tūtoko.

Geography

The range lies between Milford Sound (Piopiotahi) and the valley of the Cleddau River (to the west) and the broad valley of the Hollyford River to the east at the northern end of the national park. They are bounded to the south by the Homer Saddle, which separates them from the Wick Mountains, and to the north by the coast of the Tasman Sea. The Homer Tunnel lies under the southwesternmost extreme of the range. 

Other than Mount Tūtoko, other prominent peaks in the range include Mount Madeline and Mount Christina. Numerous lakes and tarns are found within the range, among the largest being Lake Adelaide and Lake Marian, and several rivers have their watershed in the mountains, such as the Tūtoko, Kaipo, and Bowen Rivers. The Bowen River, close to its mouth, provides one of Milford Sound's more notable natural attractions, the Bowen Falls.

The mountains were named by Captain J. Stokes, an early surveyor of the West Coast of the South Island.

Geology
The highest mountains are predominantly composed of a biotite from volcanic diorite dated to 138 ± 2.9 Ma and with younger intusion dykes of say quartz monzodiorite dated at 136 ± 1.9 Ma. These rocks are part of the Median Tectonic Zone that separates the Western and Eastern provinces of Zealandia rocks. The mountains also have components to their north of rocks such as metamorphosed sandstone and gneiss from the Western Province. In the south eastern tip is found quartz diorite.

Climbing 
Many of the mountains have known mountain climbing routes.

References

Mountain ranges of Fiordland
Volcanism of New Zealand
Fiordland National Park